Scandal Sheet is a 1939 American crime film directed by Nick Grinde and starring Otto Kruger, Ona Munson and Edward Norris.

Cast
 Otto Kruger as Jim Stevenson 
 Ona Munson as Kitty Mulhane 
 Edward Norris as Petty Haynes 
 John Dilson as Chris Durk 
 Don Beddoe as Chick Keller 
 Dorothy Comingore as Marjorie Lawe
 Eddie Laughton as Hal Lunny 
 Nedda Harrigan as Seena Haynes 
 Selmer Jackson as Douglas Haynes 
 Frank M. Thomas as District Attorney 
 Eddie Marr as Bert Schroll 
 James Craig as Mann 
 John Tyrrell as Dillon 
 Beatrice Blinn as Secretary 
 Dick Curtis as Guard 
 William Lally as Guard 
 Hermine Sterler as Mrs. Kopal 
 Barbara Pepper as Rena 
 Kathryn Sheldon as Miss Vittie 
 Gertrude Sutton as Frieda 
 George Hickman as Copy Boy 
 Robert Homans as McHale 
 C. Montague Shaw as Dean Crosby 
 Richard Fiske as Student 
 Robert Sterling as Student 
 James Millican as Student 
 Robert Spencer as Student 
 Charles McAvoy as Hickey 
 Casey Johnson as Michael Kopal 
 Hans Schumm as Dorgas 
 Walter Sande as Hurley 
 Helen Jerome Eddy as Mrs. Hazel Scoville Marsh

References

Bibliography
 Dick, Bernard F. Columbia Pictures: Portrait of a Studio. University Press of Kentucky, 2014.

External links

1939 films
1939 crime films
American crime films
1930s English-language films
Columbia Pictures films
Films directed by Nick Grinde
1930s American films